The Subang Jaya station is a railway station located in SS16, Subang Jaya. It is served by the KTM Komuter Port Klang Line and Skypark Link, as well as the LRT Kelana Jaya Line.

The station is situated at the city centre of Subang Jaya behind Subang Parade and AEON Big Subang. It is a popular train and bus hub and is commonly used by college students for travel to and from colleges and universities like SEGi University, Taylor's University, Monash University, INTI College, the University of Wollongong and Sunway University. The journey time to KL Sentral from this station is approximately 30 minutes. Buses that offer services from the station include Bas Selangorku and Rapid KL.

History

Kelana Jaya Line extension

As part of the LRT Extension Project, the Kelana Jaya Line was extended by 17 km to Putra Heights through Subang Jaya and USJ. The station Subang Jaya station allows passengers to interchange between the KTM Komuter and the LRT. The Kelana Jaya Line extension opened on 30 June 2016. Passengers wishing to change between the lines need to exit the paid areas of both services as they are operated by different fare collection systems and operators.

Skypark Link extension
An 8.15 km branch line of the Port Klang Line was constructed from Subang Jaya to the Subang Skypark Terminal at Sultan Abdul Aziz Shah Airport, providing a rail link to the airport when opened on 1 May 2018. The service, now known as Skypark Link, connects the airport directly to KL Sentral, via this station.

Station layout

The station was significantly revamped and remodelled when the station was upgraded to accommodate the LRT service. There is a common concourse for both Port Klang Line, Skypark Link and Kelana Jaya Line, located at level 1 of the station.

Around the station

 AEON BiG Subang Jaya
 ALFA International College
 Empire Subang
 Monash University
 Subang Parade
 Taylor's University

Bus Services

Feeder buses

Other buses 
Located at the opposite of the station at Jalan Kemajuan Subang.

Gallery

See also
Similar layout:
 Abdullah Hukum
 Sungai Buloh
 Kajang
Similar function
 Bandar Tasik Selatan - integrated station between rapid transit, commuter and airport trains
 Putrajaya/Cyberjaya ERL station - opening Dec 2022/Jan 2023

References

External links
 Subang Jaya KTM Komuter Station
 Subang Jaya LRT Station

Railway stations in Selangor
Rapid transit stations in Selangor
Port Klang Line